Benjamin Baldy Culp (January 19, 1914 – October 23, 2000) was an American professional baseball player and coach. A catcher, he appeared in 15 Major League games for the Philadelphia Phillies (–44).

Culp is one of many ballplayers who only appeared in the Major Leagues during World War II, making his debut on September 17, 1942, in a home game against the Chicago Cubs at Shibe Park. Culp served in the United States Navy during the last two years of the war.  He then returned to the MLB Phillies as a coach during the –47 seasons, working under manager Ben Chapman.

His MLB career totals include 15 games played, 5 hits in 26 at bats (.192), a .276 on-base percentage, 2 runs batted in, and 5 runs scored.  In the field he handled 25 of 27 total chances successfully for a fielding percentage of .926, well below the league average at the time.

Culp died in his hometown of Philadelphia, Pennsylvania, at the age of 86.

References

External links

Retrosheet

1914 births
2000 deaths
Baseball coaches from Pennsylvania
Baseball players from Pennsylvania
Dover Orioles players
Lancaster Red Roses players
Major League Baseball catchers
Minor league baseball managers
Philadelphia Phillies coaches
Philadelphia Phillies players
United States Navy personnel of World War II